Alumínio (Portuguese meaning aluminum) is a Brazilian municipality of the state of São Paulo. It is part of the Metropolitan Region of Sorocaba. The population is 18,767 (2020 est.) in an area of 83.66 km². The elevation is 790 m.  Alumínio is located east of Sorocaba and is also a suburban area. The main employer in Alumínio is Companhia Brasileira de Aluminio.

History 
The history of the city starts with the Rodovalho Railway, named after Col. Antônio Proost Rodovalho, owner of a factory in Alumínio. His factory existed until 1920. Alumínio was part of São Roque city until Mairinque was emancipated as an independent city and yet, Alumínio was just a borough of Mairinque. In 1991, Alumínio was emancipated and became a city.

Neighbouring places
Mairinque
Sorocaba
Votorantim
Ibiúna

Population history

Demographics

According to the 2000 IBGE Census, the population was 15,252, of which 13,727 are urban and 1,525 are rural. The average life expectancy was 69.03 years. The literacy rate was at 92.89%.

References

External links
  https://web.archive.org/web/20070929001931/http://www.guiasaoroque.com.br/aluminio/aluminio.htm
  http://www.aluminio.sp.gov.br
  Alumínio on citybrazil.com.br

Municipalities in São Paulo (state)